Petaloconchus varians is a species of sea snail, a marine gastropod mollusk in the family Vermetidae, the worm snails or worm shells.

Distribution

Description 
The maximum recorded shell length is 200 mm.

Habitat 
Minimum recorded depth is 0 m. Maximum recorded depth is 0 m.

References

Vermetidae
Gastropods described in 1839